is one of the techniques adopted later by the Kodokan into their Shinmeisho No Waza (newly accepted techniques) list. It is categorized as a foot technique, Ashi-waza.

Included Systems 
Judo

External links
Judo Techniques by type.
Judo Lists by rank.

Judo technique